The Third Bank of the River is a 1994 Brazilian drama film directed by Nelson Pereira dos Santos. It is based on the short stories "A Menina de Lá", "Os Irmãos Dagobé", "Fatalidade", "Seqüência", and "A Terceira Margem do Rio" by João Guimarães Rosa compiled into the book Primeiras Estórias. It was entered into the 44th Berlin International Film Festival.

Cast
 Ilya São Paulo as Liojorge
 Sonia Saurin as Alva
 Barbara Brandt as Nhinhinha
 Maria Ribeiro as mother
 Mariane Vicentini as Rosário
 Chico Díaz as Rogério
 Henrique Rovira as Herculinão
 Waldir Onofre as Dismundo
 Ana Maria Nascimento e Silva
 Vanja Orico
 Affonso Brazza
 Joffre Soares

References

External links

1994 drama films
1994 films
1990s Portuguese-language films
Brazilian drama films
Films based on short fiction
Films based on works by João Guimarães Rosa
Films directed by Nelson Pereira dos Santos